The 1947–48 season was Gimnàstic de Tarragona's sixty-first season in the club's existence and the debut season in La Liga.

Squad

League table

Matches

References

External links
 Gimnàstic's official site

Spanish football clubs 1947–48 season
Gimnàstic de Tarragona seasons